Shaw and Crompton is a civil parish in the Metropolitan Borough of Oldham, Greater Manchester, England.  It contains 19 listed buildings that are recorded in the National Heritage List for England.  Of these, one is listed at Grade II*, the middle grade, and the others are at Grade II, the lowest grade.  The parish contains the town of Shaw and Crompton and the surrounding countryside.  Most of the listed buildings are farmhouses, farm buildings, houses and cottages, many of them dating from the late 18th century.  The other listed buildings include an ancient cross shaft, churches, a lych gate, and a war memorial.

Key

Buildings

References

Citations

Sources

Lists of listed buildings in Greater Manchester
Buildings and structures in the Metropolitan Borough of Oldham
Listed